Schnider is a surname. Notable people with the surname include:

 Andreas Schnider (born 1959), Austrian theologian, academic teacher, author, publisher, consultant and politician of the (ÖVP)
 Jan Schnider (born 1983), Swiss beach volleyball player
 Pascale Schnider (born 1984), Swiss cyclist
 Gert Schnider, Austrian board game player

Occupational surnames